Olajumoke Omoniyi Oduwole is a Nigerian jurist and academic. She was appointed the Prince Claus Chair holder from 2013–2015.

Early life and education
Jumoke Oduwole was born in Lagos State, Nigeria where she completed her primary and secondary education. She graduated from the University of Lagos with a second-class upper LL.B degree in law in 1998 and was called to the Nigerian Bar in 1999. She obtained a LL.M degree with a slant in Commercial law from the Cambridge University, England in 2000 where she was as a DFID-Cambridge Commonwealth Trust scholar. In 2007, Oduwole received a master's degree in International Legal Studies from Stanford University, USA and was a Graduate Fellow at the Stanford Center on International Conflict and Negotiation (SCICN) from 2007 to 2008.  She was a visiting scholar at University of Houston Law Center, Houston, Texas USA from 2008 to 2010 and obtained her doctorate degree in International Trade and Development (WTO Negotiation Strategy) from Stanford Law School. Oduwole is a past co-president of the Stanford Alumni Club of Nigeria and was a member of the executive committee of the Oxford and Cambridge (Oxbridge) Club of Nigeria. An avid street photographer, she has held two exhibitions in the Netherlands and one in Lagos, Nigeria. She is married with two children.

Career
Jumoke Oduwole is Special Adviser to the President of Nigeria on Ease of Doing Business in the Office of the Vice President. Until her appointment to this role in August 2019, Oduwole was Senior Special Assistant to the President on Industry, Trade & Investment (OVP) from November 2015 to May 2019 in which she worked to form the Nigerian Office for Trade Negotiations (NOTN). She also served on the Technical Working Group of the Presidential Committee for the Impact and Readiness Assessment of the African Continental Free Trade Agreement (AfCFTA) (Sub-Committee on Ease of Doing Business) and is currently represented on Nigeria's AfCFTA Implementation National Action Committee (NAC).

Oduwole is the executive secretary to the Presidential Enabling Business Environment Council chaired by Vice President Yemi Osinbajo, with the Minister of Industry, Trade and Investment as Vice Chair, and coordinates the activities of its secretariat where policies and business reformations that would make Nigeria a progressively easier place to do business are developed and implemented.

Oduwole is currently on leave of absence from the Department of Jurisprudence and International Law, Faculty of Law, University of Lagos, Nigeria, where she is a Senior Lecturer. She joined the faculty in 2004 and was a two-term elected member of the University of Lagos Senate. She taught various subjects, including International Trade Law, International Economic Law, Law of Banking and Negotiable Instruments, Contract, and Commercial Transactions. Her current research interests include International Economic Law, Development, and Human Rights in Africa, and she is widely published.

In 2013, Oduwole was appointed as the 2013-2015 Prince Claus Chair holder, a Visiting Professorship of development and equity in honour of the late Prince Claus of The Netherlands by the Curatorium then chaired by H.M. Queen Maxima of the Netherlands.  In April 2015 she convened an inaugural Prince Claus Chair Roundtable in Lagos, Nigeria on the sidelines of the 3rd Biennial African International Economic Law Network hosted by Centre for Human Rights, Faculty of Law, University of Lagos; she also convened a second Roundtable in the Hague in the same year.

Oduwole was a member of the Executive Council of the Society of International Economic Law (SIEL) from 2016 to 2018. She was the only African nominated to the World Economic Forum Global Future Council on Trade & Investment in 2016 and served on the executive committee of the African International Economic Law Network (AfIELN) for two terms. Oduwole was Vice President on the executive board of the Africa Association of International Law (AAIL), representing West Africa. She is a member of both the Nigerian and American Societies of International Law (NSIL and ASIL). She serves as a trustee of the Mandela Institute for Development Studies, an Africa-wide think tank on governance, economic development, and evolution of African institutions. She was previously on the Boards of Ecobank Nigeria Plc and Positive Action for Treatment Access (PATA), an HIV/AIDS advocacy NGO in Nigeria. She was a 2013 Archbishop Desmond Tutu Fellow of the African Leadership Institute. In 2019, she was one of three women recognized by ALN Women at the 10th Anniversary Dinner of African Leadership Network (ALN) at its Annual Gathering for their impact on Africans through career accomplishments. In January 2020 Oduwole was selected as one of 15 women leaders across the African continent with high leadership potential to form the inaugural cohort of The Amujae Initiative, the flagship undertaking of the Ellen Johnson Sirleaf Presidential Center for Women and Development.

Oduwole is a speaker and contributor, and has been invited to present at several reputable conferences and workshops, including the World Economic Forum on Africa, International Centre for Trade and Sustainable Development (ICTSD), Office of the High Commissioner for Human Rights (OHCHR), the European Union Commission, and the International Criminal Court, among others. Most recently, she was invited to contribute an article to "The Futures Report – Making the AfCFTA work for Women and Youth" jointly published by the African Union's AfCFTA Secretariat and the UNDP, which was launched in December 2020.

Prior to her career in academia, Oduwole led a corporate banking unit in the telecommunications sector team at Guaranty Trust Bank Plc's Corporate Banking Group. She was also an investment banker with FCMB Capital Markets, a division of First City Monument Bank Plc from 2000 to 2003 where she worked on several Capital Raising, Mergers and Acquisition and Privatisation transactions for multinational and domestic clients. She was also on the research faculty of the Nigeria Economic Summit Group (NESG).

Publications
Jumoke Oduwole, Nothing Ventured, Nothing Gained? A Case Study of Africa's Participation in WTO Dispute Settlement, Int. J. Private Law, Vol. 2, No. 4, 2009. pp. 358–370 (Switzerland).
Jumoke Oduwole, WTO Doha Round Agriculture Negotiations: The ‘Development Component’ and Africa, Sauti: Stanford Journal of African Studies, Volume VI ~ 2009/10 pp. 16–25 (USA).
Jumoke Oduwole, An Appraisal Of Developing Country Coalition Strategy In The WTO Doha Round Agriculture Negotiations, Currents: International Trade Law Journal, South Texas College of Law, (Summer 2012) pp. 45–52. (USA).
Jumoke Oduwole, Developing Countries and Consensus-Based Decision-Making In The WTO: The Doha Experience, Journal of International Law and Diplomacy, Vol. 1:1, 2013 pp. 75–101 (Nigeria).
Jumoke Oduwole, WTO Special and Differential Treatment: Africa's Golden Fleece or Trojan Horse? SADC Law Journal, 2013 vol. 3, Issue 1 pp. 59–79 fall 2013 (South Africa).
Jumoke Oduwole, International Trade Dispute Remedies: How Equitable for Africa? Vol. 32 Journal of Private and Property Law pp. 92–105 (2014) (Nigeria).
Jumoke Oduwole, A Critical Analysis of the Non-Participation of African Countries in the WTO Dispute Settlement Mechanism Vol 20 African Yearbook of International Law/Annuaire Africain de droit international (2013-2014) pp. 157–89 [Special volume in honour of 80th birthday of Professor Georges Abi-Saab] (The Netherlands).
Jumoke Oduwole, African Participation at the World Trade Organization - Legal and Institutional Aspects, 1995-2010 (Author: Joan Apecu Laker; Publisher: Martinus Nijhoff; Year of Publication: 2014) (The Netherlands).
Jumoke Oduwole, An Evaluation of Africa's Contribution to the Implementation of the Right to Development in International Law, in Shielding Humanity: Essays in Honour of Judge Abdul Koroma, International Court of Justice from 1994 to 2012, Charles Jalloh and Olufemi Elias (eds) pp 565–90 (Brill 2015) (The Netherlands) (Book chapter).
Jumoke Oduwole, International Law and the Right to Development:  A Pragmatic Approach for Africa, Inaugural Lecture Monograph, Prince Claus Chair in Development and Equity, International Institute of Social Studies, Erasmus University Rotterdam,  2014 pp. 1–44 (The Netherlands).
Jumoke Oduwole, The ECOWAS Common External Tariff and Nigeria in Law and Practice of Indirect Taxes In Nigeria, Abiola Sanni (ed.), (Chartered Institute of Taxation Nigeria, 2014) pp. 233–364. (Book chapter).
Jumoke Oduwole, Human Rights, International Norms and Transnational Corporations: The story so far Vol. 1 Journal of Public Law [2013] pp. 65–81 (Nigeria).

References

Bibliography

Living people
Nigerian women jurists
Academic staff of the University of Lagos
University of Lagos alumni
Alumni of the University of Cambridge
Stanford University alumni
People from Lagos State
Nigerian women academics
20th-century births
Lawyers from Lagos
Nigerian expatriates in the United States
Nigerian expatriates in the United Kingdom
Year of birth missing (living people)
 Yoruba people